George Westinghouse Memorial Bridge in East Pittsburgh, Pennsylvania, carries U.S. Route 30, the Lincoln Highway, over the Turtle Creek Valley near to where it joins the Monongahela River Valley east of Pittsburgh. The reinforced concrete open-spandrel deck arch bridge has a total length of  comprising five spans. It cost $1.75 million ($ in  dollars). The design engineers were Vernon R. Covell and George S. Richardson, with architectural design by Stanley Roush. The pylons at the ends of the bridges feature Art Deco reliefs by Frank Vittor.

The bridge is named for George Westinghouse (October 6, 1846 – March 12, 1914), the American entrepreneur and engineer. Nearby was the famous Westinghouse Electric Corporation East Pittsburgh Works, which is now an industrial park. Notable attractions visible while driving across the bridge include the Edgar Thomson Steel Works (U.S. Steel Mon Valley Works) and Kennywood Park.

Popular culture
The bridge was featured in the 2011 film Warrior starring Joel Edgerton and Tom Hardy.

See also
 
 
 
 Westinghouse Memorial
 List of bridges documented by the Historic American Engineering Record in Pennsylvania
 List of bridges in the United States by height

References

Further reading

External links

George Westinghouse Memorial Bridge at pghbridges.com

Bridges completed in 1932
Road bridges on the National Register of Historic Places in Pennsylvania
Historic American Engineering Record in Pennsylvania
Lincoln Highway
Pittsburgh History & Landmarks Foundation Historic Landmarks
U.S. Route 30
Bridges of the United States Numbered Highway System
National Register of Historic Places in Allegheny County, Pennsylvania
Open-spandrel deck arch bridges in the United States
Concrete bridges in the United States
Bridges in Allegheny County, Pennsylvania